Tokiji Yoshinaga  was a Japanese politician who served as governor of Hiroshima Prefecture from March 26, 1941 to June 15, 1942.

References 

Governors of Hiroshima
1892 births
1976 deaths
Japanese Home Ministry government officials